Eric V. dela Cruz (born November 20, 1981 in Manila) is a Filipino theater actor. He played Oedipus alongside Gigette Reyes in the 2004 production of Sophocles' play Oedipus Rex and has appeared in TV shows and films.

Early life 
He was born Eric Villanueva dela Cruz in Manila, Philippines, to engineer Enrique dela Cruz, Sr. and singer Isidora dela Cruz. He has three siblings.

Dela Cruz graduated from the University of Santo Tomas in Manila in 2003 with a degree in Physical Therapy but decided to forgo a career in health care to pursue acting. He trained at the New Voice Company Summer Acting Workshop, where he got his first taste of the stage. He played the Sexton in Neil Simon's The Good Doctor. He participated in Tanghalang Pilipino's Intermediate Acting Workshop. He played the role of Fernan Gomez de Guzman in their staging of Lope de Vega's Fuente Ovejuna as their recital. He is a Senior Artist-Teacher for Philippine Educational Theater Association (PETA). He took his MA in Theater at the University of the Philippines Diliman.

Career 
His first major stage role was as Oedipus. He appeared in TV shows including GMA ch. 7's Hanggang Kailan, La Vendetta and Marimar and ABSCBN ch. 2's Hiram and Maalaala Mo Kaya.

His film debut was in a digital film workshop production titled La Funeraria Toti, produced by the GMA Artist Center. He played the role of an OFW with HIV who was deported to the Philippines. The film was directed by Rahyan Carlos and co-starred Soxie Topacio, Isay Alvarez, Allan Paule and Hero Bautista. It was tied up with the AIDS Society of the Philippines benefit for people living with AIDS and was endorsed by the Mowelfund to the Philippine Pink Festival. He then appeared in the movie Iskul Bukol 20 Years After produced by Octoarts Films for the 2008 MMFF. He plays the role of Toyoma.

He was included in a mobile production produced by PETA for an interactive children's musical play titled Mga Kwento Ni Lola Basyang which ran for two years. He appeared in Tanghalang Pilipino's Ang mga Huwad adapted for stage by Rody Vera from the novel The Pretenders by Philippine National Artist for Literature, F. Sionil Jose. He portrayed the role of Johnny Lee and Estaquio Salvador. He portrayed Robert Montgomery in Tanghalang Pilipino's restaging of Pilipinas Circa 1907. He acted in the restaging of the PETA production of Romulus d' Grayt, portraying Apolonius and Teodorico. He was in the 2008 PETA Musical Comedy Skin Deep as Ador/ Chorus and recently in Noli at Fili Dekada 2000 (Dos Mil), Nick Tiongson's contemporary adaptation of the two novels by Dr. Jose Rizal. He was involved in DUP's Isang Panaginip na Fili, a musical adaptation of Rizal's El Filibusterismo written and directed by Floy Quintos. He played Tunying and Simoun. He played Hector in Stage Right's production of Kung Paano Maghiwalay, written and directed by George de Jesus. He participated in PETA's musical Si Juan Tamad, ang Diablo at ang Limang Milyong Boto, an advocacy play for the May 2010 National Elections.

Columnist 
Eric had a weekly column on men's fashion in the i section of the Manila Bulletin titled "Back to Basics." He was a creative consultant in the first issue and a contributor in the second issue of the magazine IMAGINE for Sesame Seed Publications.

Eric dela Cruz, the actor is not the same person as Eric de la Cruz, the director.

References

1981 births
Living people
Male actors from Manila
University of Santo Tomas alumni
University of the Philippines Diliman alumni
Manila Bulletin people